Brocken-Hochharz was a Verwaltungsgemeinschaft ("collective municipality") in the district of Harz, in Saxony-Anhalt, Germany. It was situated in the Harz mountains, southwest of Wernigerode. It was named after the highest peak of the Harz: Brocken. The seat of the Verwaltungsgemeinschaft was in Hasselfelde. It was disbanded on 1 January 2010.

The Verwaltungsgemeinschaft Brocken-Hochharz consisted of the following municipalities:

 Allrode 
 Benneckenstein
 Elend 
 Hasselfelde
 Sorge 
 Stiege
 Tanne

References

Former Verwaltungsgemeinschaften in Saxony-Anhalt